Giovanni Martino or Giovanni Martini, also known as John Martin (1852, Sala Consilina - 24 December 1922, New York City) was an Italian-American soldier and trumpeter. He served both in Italy with Giuseppe Garibaldi and in the United States under George Armstrong Custer.  He is best known as the only survivor from Custer's company in the Battle of Little Big Horn.

Biography

Although details of Martino's origin and birth were ambiguous in the years following the Little Big Horn, more recent research conducted by Italian researchers has provided more definitive proof of his origins, as evidenced by the comune (or town) of Sala Consilina's (Province of Salerno) municipal records.  He was born in the period between late November 1851 and early January 1852 in or around Sala Consilina, but was subsequently left at one of the town's Proietto Domiciliata (orphanages).  Within a day of his abandonment on January 28, 1852, he was provided a name (Giovanni Crisostomo Martino), baptized and placed into the home of a local wet nurse. 
  
The unreliability of parish records – as opposed to municipal birth and death registers - inspired two Italian municipalities to claim him as one of their own: Apricale (Province of Imperia) and Sala Consilina (Province of Salerno).  New evidence appears to substantiate the latter.  Although Martino himself, in an interview in 1922 a few months before his death, claimed to have been born in Rome in 1851, Martino's advanced age - as observed and noted by the interviewer, Colonel William Graham – contributed to this apparent self-contradiction.

According to Martino's diary, as recorded during a 1906 interview, he joined the Corpo Volontari Italiani in 1866, led by Italian patriot Giuseppe Garibaldi, as a drummer boy for several years  before eventually returning to Sala Consilina, where municipal records indicate a reconciliation occurred between Martin and his biological father. By 1873, Martino boarded a ship in Naples bound for the United States and was registered at Castle Clinton upon landing (as Giovanni Martino, a 21-year-old laborer from Sala). His true name, prior to its anglicization, was confirmed as Giovanni Martino during his registration, effectively dispelling the widespread belief in later years that he was Giovanni Martini.  One year later, facing limited employment options, he enlisted with the United States Army as John Martin and was assigned to Jefferson Barracks in Missouri to begin training as a cavalry trooper and bugler before his permanent assignment to the U.S. Seventh Cavalry Regiment, led by Lieutenant Colonel George Armstrong Custer.

In 1876, he was attached to Company H but on the morning of June 25, Martin was temporarily assigned to serve as one of Custer's bugler-orderlies. As Custer and nearly 210 troopers and scouts began their final approach to the massive Indian village located in the Little Big Horn River valley, Martin was dispatched with an urgent note for reinforcements and ammunition.  Newspaper accounts of the period referred to him as “Custer massacre survivor” and “the last white man to see Custer alive”. Martin and the remaining Seventh Cavalry companies not riding with Custer were trapped on a nearby hill and fought off repeated attacks for 36 hours until their rescue by another U.S. Army column.

In 1879, while serving in an artillery battery at Fort Schuyler (New York), he met and married an Irish girl named Julia Higgins, who would give birth to five surviving children. The first one was named George in memory of G.A. Custer.  Martin's last action in combat came during the Spanish–American War (1898–1900).  He served in the Army until age limitations forced his retirement in 1904.  Martin remained with his family in Baltimore, Maryland, where they lived and operated a sweets and candy store.  By 1906, perhaps following one of his daughters, he moved to Brooklyn, New York, and took a job as a ticket agent at the 103rd Street Station of the recently-built New York City subway system.  As he aged, the long hours and commute of his ticket-taker job forced Martin to take a watchman's job at the nearby Navy Yard in 1915.  In 1922, while crossing a Brooklyn street, Martin was injured by a truck and hospitalized.  He died from complications on December 24, 1922, and was buried three days later in the Veterans section of the Cypress Hill Cemetery in Brooklyn, New York.

References in popular culture
Italian comedian David Riondino has staged a drama based on Giovanni Martino's character, entitled Il trombettiere ("The trumpeter").

References
 Leo Solimine, "Custer's Bugler: The Life of John Martin (Giovanni Martino), Universal-Publishers, 2012
 
 Giuseppe Mercenaro, Giovanni Martini, il garibaldino che scampò al Little Big Horn, "Secolo XIX", 15 February 2004.
Antonia Bonomi, John Martin, il Giovanni Crisostomo Martino trombettiere italiano che salvò la pelle a Little Big Horn, Arcobaleno00, 9 (9).
Claudio Nobbio and David Riondino, John Martin, Il trombettiere di Apricale. Da Garibaldi a Custer'', Fratelli Frilli Editori, Genoa 2007.

United States Army soldiers
1852 births
1922 deaths
Italian exiles
United States Army personnel of the Indian Wars